Easy peasy may refer to:

 EasyPeasy, a discontinued a Linux-based operating system for netbooks
 Abe Mosseri (born 1974), an American professional poker player also known by his online alias EazyPeazy
 Zenith Eazy PC, an all-in-one computer marketed by Zenith Data Systems in 1987